The William Talley House in Safford, Arizona was built in 1928.  It was listed on the National Register of Historic Places in 1988.

It was deemed significant as the home of Safford lumberman William Talley, and as the finest example of Spanish Colonial Revival style in Safford.

See also
 Hugh Talley House, also NRHP-listed in Safford, Arizona
 William Talley House (Wilmington, Delaware), NRHP-listed in Wilmington, Delaware

References

Safford, Arizona
Houses in Graham County, Arizona
Houses completed in 1928
Houses on the National Register of Historic Places in Arizona
1928 establishments in Arizona
Mission Revival architecture in Arizona
Spanish Colonial Revival architecture in Arizona
National Register of Historic Places in Graham County, Arizona